Parallactis panchlora is a moth in the family Autostichidae. It was described by Edward Meyrick in 1911. It is found in South Africa.

The wingspan is about 15 mm. The forewings are pale yellow ochreous, the costa somewhat yellower. The hindwings are whitish ochreous.

References

Endemic moths of South Africa
Moths described in 1911
Parallactis
Taxa named by Edward Meyrick